Aavere may refer to several places in Estonia:

Aavere, Harju County, village in Anija Parish, Harju County
Aavere, Tamsalu Parish, village in Tamsalu Parish, Lääne-Viru County
Aavere, Väike-Maarja Parish, village in Väike-Maarja Parish, Lääne-Viru County
Aavere, part of Lemmatsi village, Ülenurme Parish, Tartu County